Mason Glacier is a glacier draining the eastern slopes of the Worcester Range, Antarctica, immediately south of Bareface Bluff, and flowing east into Skelton Glacier. It was named by the Advisory Committee on Antarctic Names in 1964 for Richard G. Hogan-Mason, a biologist at McMurdo Station in 1961–62 and 1962–63.

References

Glaciers of Hillary Coast